Quiberon (French: Gare de Quiberon) is a railway station in Quiberon, Brittany, France. The station was opened on 24 July 1882, and is located at kilometric point (KP) 612,142 on the Auray–Quiberon railway. The station is served by TER Bretagne services operated by the SNCF, between Auray and Quiberon (summer only).

History 
In 2018, the SNCF estimated that the station served 101 288 passengers during the year.

References

External links
 Auray-Quiberon timetable

TER Bretagne
Railway stations in France opened in 1882
Railway stations in Morbihan